Christopher O'Shea Cook (born February 15, 1987) is a former American football cornerback. He played college football at Virginia and was drafted by the Minnesota Vikings in the second round of the 2010 NFL Draft.

High school career
Cook attended Heritage High School in Lynchburg, Virginia. He played running back, wide receiver and quarterback on offense, and cornerback on defense. He rushed for 789 yards and 12 touchdowns and caught 10 passes for 250 yards and three more scores as a senior, he also threw six TD passes. He was named first-team all-state defensive back as a junior when he made more than 50 tackles and intercepted eight passes. Considered a three-star by Rivals.com, Cook accepted a scholarship to Virginia over Virginia Tech.

College career
Cook started 31-of-38 games for the Virginia Cavaliers, collecting 143 tackles with 5.5 tackles for loss, one forced fumble, one fumble recovery for a touchdown, 19 passes breakups and seven interceptions, two which he returned for touchdowns. His best season came as a senior, where he collected 40 tackles, including one stop for a three-yard loss, totaled a team-high four interceptions, one which he returned for a touchdown, and deflected six passes, including four on third down.

Professional career

Minnesota Vikings

Cook was drafted by the Vikings in the second round with the 34th overall selection in the 2010 NFL Draft.

During a game against the Chicago Bears on December 1, 2013, Cook was ejected for making illegal contact with an official following an Alshon Jeffery touchdown.

San Francisco 49ers
On March 14, 2014, Cook signed a one-year contract with the San Francisco 49ers. On March 14, 2015, Cook signed another one-year contract with the 49ers. He was released by the team on August 5, 2015.

NFL career statistics

References

External links
San Francisco 49ers bio
Virginia Cavaliers bio

1987 births
Living people
Sportspeople from Lynchburg, Virginia
Players of American football from Virginia
African-American players of American football
American football cornerbacks
American football safeties
Virginia Cavaliers football players
Minnesota Vikings players
San Francisco 49ers players
21st-century African-American sportspeople
20th-century African-American people